Paralleloneurum is a genus of flies in the family Dolichopodidae.

Species
Paralleloneurum cilifemoratum Becker, 1902
Paralleloneurum pygmaeum De Meijere, 1916

References

Hydrophorinae
Dolichopodidae genera
Taxa named by Theodor Becker
Diptera of Asia